Chimeh (also Romanized as Chīmeh; also known as Chīma and Maḩalleh-ye Deh-e Chīmeh) is a village in Barzrud Rural District, in the Central District of Natanz County, Isfahan Province, Iran. At the 2006 census, its population was 283, in 139 families.

References 

Populated places in Natanz County